William J. Zloch (born September 16, 1944 in Fort Lauderdale, Florida) is a senior United States district judge of the United States District Court for the Southern District of Florida, as well as a former American football quarterback and wide receiver for the University of Notre Dame.

College football

Following the departure of Heisman Trophy winner John Huarte in 1965, Notre Dame football coach Ara Parseghian was faced with a wide-open competition for the quarterback position. He opted to move senior Bill Zloch from wide receiver to quarterback for the 1965 season. Directing a team that was heavily run-oriented, Zloch finished the season completing 36 of 88 passes for 558 yards and three touchdowns. The team finished 7-2-1 and ranked 8th nationally.

Education and career

Zloch graduated from the University of Notre Dame with a Bachelor of Arts degree in 1966. After graduation, he spent three years in the United States Navy, achieving the rank of lieutenant, then returned to Notre Dame Law School, completing a Juris Doctor in 1974. He returned to Fort Lauderdale, Florida where he practiced law from 1974 to 1985.

Federal judicial service

On October 9, 1985, President Ronald Reagan nominated Zloch to a new seat on the United States District Court for the Southern District of Florida created by 98 Stat. 333. He was confirmed by the United States Senate on November 1, 1985, and received his commission on November 4, 1985. On July 1, 2000, he began a seven-year term as Chief Judge of the district, ending on June 30, 2007. He was succeeded as Chief Judge by Judge Federico A. Moreno. He assumed senior status on January 31, 2017.

Notable case

On August 21, 2009, Judge Zloch sentenced UBS whistleblower Bradley Birkenfeld to 40 months in prison with 3 years probation and a $30,000 fine, a term that was harsher than the prosecutors wanted. "Assistant U.S. attorney Jeffrey A. Neiman recommended that Birkenfeld get 30 months in prison for his conviction on one count of conspiracy to defraud the government—down from the 60-month maximum sentence he is exposed to—because of his extensive cooperation," the Miami Herald reported.

References

Sources
 

1944 births
Living people
American football quarterbacks
Florida lawyers
Judges of the United States District Court for the Southern District of Florida
Notre Dame Fighting Irish football players
Notre Dame Law School alumni
Players of American football from Fort Lauderdale, Florida
Zloch, William
United States district court judges appointed by Ronald Reagan
20th-century American judges
United States Navy officers
University of Notre Dame alumni
21st-century American judges